The name Henri has been used for six tropical cyclones in the Atlantic Ocean:

Hurricane Henri (1979), took unusual route around Yucatán Peninsula, caused no significant damage
Tropical Storm Henri (1985), crossed Long Island as a weak storm, no damages or casualties
Tropical Storm Henri (2003), caused heavy rainfall along Florida's Gulf coast, Delaware, and Pennsylvania, causing $19.6 million (USD) in damage
Tropical Storm Henri (2009), moderate tropical storm that formed northeast of the Lesser Antilles, causing no known deaths or damage
Tropical Storm Henri (2015), a short-lived tropical storm, did not affect land
Hurricane Henri (2021), moved clockwise around Bermuda before taking aim on southern New England; briefly strengthened into a Category 1 hurricane, before weakening back to a tropical storm and making landfall in Westerly, Rhode Island

Atlantic hurricane set index articles